The Ultimate Collection is a compact disc by Diana Ross and the Supremes, released on Motown Records, catalogue 314530827-2, in October 1997. It is a collection of singles comprising many of the group's greatest hits, with liner notes written by Diane Marie Weathers.

Content
The disc contains every Top 40 hit on the Billboard Hot 100 enjoyed by The Supremes while Diana Ross was a member of the group. The songs "I'm Gonna Make You Love Me" and "I'll Try Something New" are collaborations with and co-credited to their Motown colleagues, The Temptations. Every iconic song by the group during this period is present, and twelve of the 25 tracks here topped the chart. Historically, only Elvis Presley, The Beatles, Michael Jackson, and Mariah Carey have had more #1 singles chart hits in the United States. The disc was part of an "Ultimate Collection" series issued that year by Motown for many of their top-selling classic artists.

Starting in the late 1960s and early 1970s, standard industry practice shifted to a focus on album sales, where a single became less a separate entity and more simply an advertisement for an LP, and a lead single would be pulled off an album as a promotional tool. Prior to this, singles were concentrated upon as a profitable commodity, especially for smaller record labels, and albums were often built around already successful singles. Since Motown fixated on the hit single until the very end of its stay in Detroit, single versions of songs often featured different mixes than versions that would be later placed on albums. Singles were usually mixed "punchier" and "hotter" to sound better on car radios receiving AM broadcast. The single versions are the ones appearing here.

Personnel
 Diana Ross — lead vocals
 Mary Wilson — vocals
 Florence Ballard — vocals tracks 1-16
 Cindy Birdsong — vocals tracks 17-25
 The Funk Brothers — instruments
 Members of the Detroit Symphony Orchestra conducted by Gordon Staples — strings

Track listing
Singles chart peak positions from Billboard charts; no R&B chart existed from November 30, 1963, through January 23, 1965. Tracks with The Temptations marked with an asterisk.

References

1997 compilation albums
The Supremes compilation albums
Motown compilation albums